Yverdon-Champ Pittet railway station is a railway station in the municipality of Yverdon-les-Bains, in the Swiss canton of Vaud. It is an intermediate stop on the standard gauge Fribourg–Yverdon line of Swiss Federal Railways.

The long name of the station is Yverdon-les-Bains-Champ Pittet.

Services
The following services stop at Yverdon-Champ Pittet:

References

External links 
 
 

Railway stations in the canton of Vaud
Swiss Federal Railways stations